Willoughby Staples Brewster (July 9, 1860 – December 28, 1932) was an Ontario lawyer and political figure. He represented Brant South in the Legislative Assembly of Ontario from 1908 to 1914 as a Conservative member.

He was born in Haldimand Township, Northumberland County, Ontario, the son of John Brewster, and was educated at Victoria College in Cobourg. He articled in law in Brantford and set up practice there. In 1887, he married Mary L. Horning. In 1898, he married Belle Roberts after the death of his first wife. Brewster served on the town council and the public school board. He was also president of the Brantford Chamber of Commerce. Brewster ran unsuccessfully for a seat in the provincial assembly in 1905. During his time in the assembly, he played an important role in the passing of the Ontario Workmen's Compensation Act. One of his children, Harold Staples Brewster (1893–1916) was attending Osgood Hall Law School when he joined the Royal Air Corp in May 1915. He died in Europe the following year on 6 Dec 1916. Willoughby died in Brantford in 1932.

References 
 Canadian Parliamentary Guide, 1912, EJ Chambers

External links 

The Canadian album : Men of Canada ..., W Cochrane (1891)
History of the county of Brant. Volume 1, FD Reville (1920)
Members of Provincial Parliament: Brantford Public Library

1860 births
1932 deaths
Progressive Conservative Party of Ontario MPPs
Canadian Methodists